Young Caesar maybe refer to:
 Young Caesar (novel), a 1958 novel
 Young Caesar (opera), a 1970 opera